Widdrington is a surname, and may refer to:
 The various barons Widdrington, including:
 William Widdrington, 1st Baron Widdrington (1610 – 1651)
 His great-grandson William Widdrington, 4th Baron Widdrington (1678 – 1743)
 The 1st Baron's relative Sir Thomas Widdrington, and Thomas's brother Ralph
 Tommy Widdrington (born 1971), English-born footballer who played for Southampton and Port Vale
 His son Kai Widdrington (born 1995), dancer
 His son Theo Widdrington (born 1999), footballer
 Samuel Edward Cook (writer), took the name of Widdrington, his mother being the heiress of some of the estates of this family

Pseudonyms 
 Thomas Preston (Benedictine monk), adopted the pen-name of Roger Widdrington

See also